Bemasoandro Itaosy is a commune in Analamanga Region, in the  Central Highlands of Madagascar. It belongs to the district of Antananarivo-Atsimondrano and its populations numbers to 49,744 in 2018.

References

Monographie Anjeva Gara

Populated places in Analamanga